Stom may refer to:

Ben Stom (1886–1965), Dutch footballer
Matthias Stom (c. 1600 – after 1652), Dutch, or possibly Flemish, Caravaggist painter

See also
STOM, also known as Stomatin, is a human gene